Quaker school  may refer to:
 List of Friends schools, a school which provides an education based on the beliefs and testimonies of the Religious Society of Friends (Quakers)
 Quaker School (Burlington), one such establishment in Burlington, New Jersey and on the National Register of Historic Places